Vida Spears (born April 8, 1956) is an American television producer and writer. She is best known as the co-creator, with Ralph Farquhar and Sara Finney-Johnson, of the UPN sitcoms Moesha, starring Brandy, and The Parkers, starring Countess Vaughn and Mo'Nique.

Before Moesha, Spears and Finney-Johnson had been a long-term writing team, the first African-American female writing team in the television industry. A native of Baldwin, New York and a graduate of Michigan State University, Spears also served as a member of the Board of Directors for the Writers Guild of America.

Her other credits as a writer include The Jeffersons, Married...with Children, 227, and The Parent 'Hood. Along with Finney-Johnson, she served as a writer and story editor on The Facts of Life and Family Matters, where they also later served as producers.

Spears and Finney-Johnson departed Family Matters in 1996 to create Moesha with Ralph Farquhar, where they served as showrunners. When Moesha series regular Countess Vaughn was spun off into her own series, The Parkers, Spears remained with Moesha while Finney was in charge of The Parkers. Following an alleged dispute with Brandy and her manager, her mother Sonya Norwood, Spears was dismissed from Moesha in 2001 and joined Farquhar and Finney-Johnson on The Parkers instead.

References

External links

American women television producers
African-American television producers
American television writers
Living people
American women television writers
1956 births
American women screenwriters
People from Hempstead (town), New York
Television producers from New York (state)
Screenwriters from New York (state)
20th-century American screenwriters
20th-century American women writers
20th-century African-American women writers
20th-century African-American writers
21st-century African-American people
21st-century African-American women